Ukraine sent a delegation of 90 athletes to the 2004 Summer Paralympics, covering nine sports.

Medallists

Sports

Archery

Men

|-
|align=left|Serhiy Atamanenko
|align=left rowspan="2"|Men's individual standing
|591
|11
|W 147–116
|W 150–143
|L 86–95
|colspan=3|Did not advance
|-
|align=left|Yuriy Kopiy
|578
|14
|L 138–133
|colspan=5|Did not advance
|-
|align=left|Roman Hutnyk
|align=left|Men's individual W2
|557
|27
|L 145–153
|colspan=5|Did not advance
|-
|align=left|Serhiy Atamanenko Roman Hutnyk Yuriy Kopiy
|align=left|Men's teams open
|1726
|11
|N/A
|W 229–221
|L 206–226
|colspan=3|Did not advance
|}

Women

|-
|align=left|Bohdana Nikitenko
|align=left rowspan="2"|Women's individual standing
|546
|8
|N/A
|L 116–135
|colspan=4|Did not advance
|-
|align=left|Olena Struk
|516
|13
|N/A
|L 127–136
|colspan=4|Did not advance
|-
|align=left|Iryna Terletska
|align=left|Women's individual W1/W2
|550
|6
|N/A
|W 141–120
|L 92–98
|colspan=3|Did not advance
|-
|align=left|Bohdana Nikitenko Olena Struk Iryna Terletska
|align=left|Women's teams open
|1612
|7
|colspan=2|N/A
|L 198–201
|colspan=3|Did not advance
|}

Athletics

Men's track

Men's field

Women's track

Women's field

Football 7-a-side

Players
Yevhan Zhuchynin
Ihor Kosenko
Volodymyr Antonyuk
Volodymyr Kabanov
Serhiy Vakulenko
Andriy Roztoka
Andriy Tsukanov
Anatoliy Shevchyk
Denys Ponomaryov
Taras Dutko
Sergiy Babiy
Vitaliy Trushev

Results

Judo

Powerlifting

Men

Women

Swimming

Men

Women

Table tennis

Volleyball
The women's volleyball team didn't win any medals: they were 6th out of six teams.

Players
Oleksandra Granovska
Galyna Kuznetsova
Lyubov Lomakina
Inna Osetynska
Nataliya Parshutina
Tetyana Podzyuban
Ilona Yudina
Olena Yurkovska

Results

Wheelchair fencing

Men

Women

See also
2004 Summer Paralympics
Ukraine at the Paralympics
Ukraine at the 2004 Summer Olympics

References

External links
Athens 2004, International Paralympic Committee

Nations at the 2004 Summer Paralympics
2004
Paralympics